Patricia Jo Nagel (September 24, 1942 – January 30, 2021) was an editor, lawyer, consultant and state legislator in Wyoming. A Republican, she lived in Casper, Wyoming and represented Natrona County in the Wyoming House of Representatives in 1993 and 1995 continuing in office until 2002. She had a husband Bob and teo daughters.

She was born in Montana. Her family settled in Casper and she graduated from Natrona County High School and attended the University of Wyoming. Her husband served in the military and she moved with him to Maryland and New Mexico. She graduated from the New Mexico State University in 1965. The Casper Star-Tribune called her a renaissance woman.

References

2021 deaths
University of Wyoming alumni
1942 births
20th-century American politicians
21st-century American politicians
Wyoming Republicans
21st-century American women politicians
Politicians from Casper, Wyoming
20th-century American women politicians
New Mexico State University alumni
Women state legislators in Wyoming